The fourth Wowereit senate was the state government of Berlin between 2011 and 2014, sworn in on 24 November 2011 after Klaus Wowereit was elected as Governing Mayor by the members of the Abgeordnetenhaus of Berlin. It was the 25th Senate of Berlin.

It was formed after the 2011 Berlin state election by the Social Democratic Party (SPD) and Christian Democratic Union (CDU). Excluding the Governing Mayor, the senate comprised eight members, called Senators. Three were members of the SPD, four were members of the CDU, and one was an independent politician (nominated by the SPD).

After Wowereit's resignation as Governing Mayor, the fourth Wowereit senate was succeeded by the first Müller senate on 11 December 2014.

Formation 

The previous Senate was a coalition government of the SPD and The Left led by Governing Mayor Klaus Wowereit.

The election took place on 18 September 2011, and resulted in losses for both governing parties. The SPD remained in first place while The Left fell from third to fourth. The opposition CDU and Greens improved, and the Pirate Party debuted at 9%. As a result of their losses, the SPD and The Left fell short of a majority, bringing the coalition to an end.

The SPD initially began exploratory talks with the Greens; Wowereit later said that the Greens were their preferred coalition partner. However, the SPD withdrew from discussions on 5 October, citing irreconciliable disagreements over the proposed extension of the Bundesautobahn 100, which the SPD supported and the Greens opposed. They instead began negotiations with the CDU for a grand coalition. The parties presented their coalition pact on 16 November.

Wowereit was re-elected as Governing Mayor by the Abgeordnetenhaus on 24 November, winning 84 votes out of 148 cast. His Senate was sworn in on 1 December.

Composition 
The composition of the Senate at the time of its dissolution was as follows:

References

External links 

Cabinets of Berlin
Cabinets established in 2011
2011 establishments in Germany
2014 disestablishments in Germany
Cabinets disestablished in 2014